Dale Atkins (born 29 August 1961) is a former coach of the New Zealand women's national rugby union team. He replaced Jed Rowlands as coach of the Black Ferns in 2007, he was Rowlands assistant coach. He was assisted by his former Canterbury teammate and former All Blacks centre Warwick Taylor. He was not reappointed in 2009 despite not losing a single game during his term as coach.

Atkins played for Canterbury and the New Zealand Maori.

References 

1961 births
Living people
New Zealand rugby union coaches
New Zealand women's national rugby union team coaches